Jamie Whitmore Cardenas (born 4 May 1976) is a former American triathlete turned para-cyclist. Whitmore began her sports career competing in the XTERRA Triathlon throughout the 2000s. As a XTERRA triathlete, she won over thirty events and was the XTERRA world champion in 2004. After being diagnosed with spindle cell sarcoma in 2008, Whitmore moved to para-cycling in the 2010s and competed in championships held by the Union Cycliste Internationale. 

Since 2013, Whitmore has won twenty overall medals while competing at the UCI Para-cycling Road World Championships and UCI Para-cycling Track World Championships. After breaking the C3 world record in time trial and pursuit at the 2014 para-cycling track championships, Whitmore won gold in the road race and pursuit events at the 2016 Summer Paralympics. Apart from her medals, Whitmore was inducted into the XTERRA Hall of Fame in 2012 and was the winner of the Best Female Athlete with a Disability ESPY Award in 2014.

Early life and education
Whitmore was born on 4 May 1976 in Sacramento, California. During her childhood, Whitmore played in various sports before she started track and field in middle school. As an athlete, Whitmore went to California State University, Northridge on a scholarship and completed a criminology degree in 1998.

Career

Triathlon and road para-cycling
After university, Whitmore competed in mountain bike races before settling on triathlon in the early 2000s. As a competitor for XTERRA Triathlon, Whitmore was the world champion in 2004 and won over thirty races including consecutive United States championships from 2002 to 2007 excluding 2006. In 2008, Whitmore was diagnosed with spindle cell sarcoma and became paralyzed in her leg due to drop foot. After her paralysis ended her triathlon career, Whitmore returned to cycling in the 2010s. 

As a paracyclist, Whitmore began competing in championships held by the Union Cycliste Internationale in 2013. At the UCI Para-cycling Road World Championships, Whitmore won back to back gold medals at the time trial and road race events from 2013 to 2015. After not medalling in the 2017 edition, Whitmore won bronze in the road race and time trial events at the 2018 UCI Para-cycling Road World Championships. She later did not medal at the 2019 Road competition in her events.

Track para-cycling
Simultaneously, Whitmore started competing at the UCI Para-cycling Track World Championships in 2014. At the 2014 event, Whitmore broke the world records in the time trial and pursuit events for the C3 classification while winning her first track gold medals in those events. The following year, Whitmore reclaimed her gold in time trial while adding a silver in pursuit and scratch race. She added a silver in scratch race and bronze in time trial at the 2016 track championship. During the 2016 championship, she did not medal in the pursuit event. 

Whitmore added a gold in time trial and scratch in 2017 with additional bronzes in time trial, pursuit and scratch in 2018. At the 2019 and 2020 track competitions, Whitmore did not win any medals in her events. In international events, Whitmore competed at her first Paralympics during the 2016 Summer Paralympics. As a C1-3 competitor, she won gold in the road race and silver in the 3000 meters individual pursuit. At the 2020 Summer Paralympics, Whitmore did not any medals in her events.

Awards and honors
Whitmore was inducted into the XTERRA Hall of Fame in 2012 and won the Best Female Athlete with a Disability ESPY Award in 2014.

Jamie is a single mother of twin boys.

References

External links

1976 births
American female triathletes
Paralympic cyclists of the United States
Cyclists at the 2016 Summer Paralympics
Paralympic gold medalists for the United States
Paralympic silver medalists for the United States
Living people
Medalists at the 2016 Summer Paralympics
Paralympic medalists in cycling
Sportspeople from Sacramento, California
Cyclists from California
Cal State Northridge Matadors women's track and field athletes
Track and field athletes from Sacramento, California
Cyclists at the 2020 Summer Paralympics